The World Figure Skating Championships is an annual figure skating competition sanctioned by the International Skating Union in which figure skaters compete for the title of World Champion.

Men's and pairs' competitions took place from February 26 to 27 in Manchester, United Kingdom. Ladies' competitions took place from February 16 to 17 in Oslo, Norway.

Results

Men

Judges:
 Ludwig Fänner 
 Reidar Lund 
 Eugen Minich 
 C. L. Wilson 
 Herbert R. Yglesias

Ladies

Judges:
 Josef Fellner 
 Fritz Hellmund 
 Reidar Lund 
 M. Mikkelsen 
 Thor B. Poulsen

Pairs

Judges:
 Ludwig Fänner 
 Reidar Lund 
 Eugen Minich 
 C. L. Wilson 
 Herbert R. Yglesias

Sources
 Result List provided by the ISU

World Figure Skating Championships
World Figure Skating Championships
International figure skating competitions hosted by Norway
International figure skating competitions hosted by the United Kingdom
World Figure Skating Championships
World Figure Skating Championships
1920s in Oslo
World Figure Skating Championships
1920s in Manchester